Longsheng Town, may refer to:

 Longsheng, Guangdong, a town in Kaiping, Guangdong, China.
 Longsheng, Guangxi, a town in Longsheng Various Nationalities Autonomous County, Guangxi, China.